The Thomas' dwarf lemur (Cheirogaleus thomasi) is a species of dwarf lemur known only from Anosy, Madagascar. It lives in forested regions along the coast.

References

Dwarf lemurs
Mammals described in 1894
Taxa named by Charles Immanuel Forsyth Major